Alphaville: The Singles Collection is Alphaville's first "best of" compilation, consisting of remixes of singles from their first two albums, Forever Young and Afternoons in Utopia. It was released in 1988.

Reviews
The compilation consists of 2 remixes each of 4 songs. The remixes of "Big in Japan" were new mixes; all the other remixes had been made previously available.

Track listing

References

1988 greatest hits albums
Alphaville (band) albums